The Rennell shrikebill (Clytorhynchus hamlini) is a songbird species in the family Monarchidae. It is endemic to Rennell Island in the Solomon Islands. Its natural habitat is subtropical or tropical moist lowland forests.

The binomial commemorates Dr. Hannibal Hamlin, leader of the Whitney South Seas Expedition, who died in 1982.

References

Rennell shrikebill
Birds of Rennell Island
Rennell shrikebill
Taxonomy articles created by Polbot